Data Feminism is a book written by Catherine D’Ignazio and Lauren F. Klein as part literature review, part call to action, Data Feminism provides a framework for data scientists seeking to learn how feminism can help them work toward justice, and for feminists who want to focus their efforts on the growing field of data science. Through seven chapters Data Feminism provide examples of data biases and injustices, as well as strategies to redress them. In doing so, D’Ignazio and Klein suggest data feminism as "a way of thinking about data, both their uses and their limits, that is informed by direct experience, by a commitment to action, and by intersectional feminist thought". The chapters are organised according to seven guiding principles (see below): examine power, challenge power, elevate emotion and embodiment, rethink binaries and hierarchies, embrace pluralism, consider context, and make labor visible.

The starting point for data feminism is something that has gone mostly unacknowledged in data science: power is not distributed equally in the world. Data science is a form of power, and it can be used to uphold existing hierarchies or, alternatively, to discover and redress injustices. The book therefore consistently emphasises why data never, ever “speak for themselves", and how challenges to the male/female binary can help challenge other hierarchical (and empirically wrong) classification systems. The authors explain how, for example, a better understanding of emotions challenges and improves ideas about effective data visualization, and how the concept of invisible labor exposes the significant human efforts behind technologies and data-related work. 

The authors apply an intersectional feminist framework to data science. Using this framework the authors examine intertwined structural forces of power such as sex, race and class. The authors therefore also explicitly focus on data justice, as opposed to data ethics, arguing that data ethics and its focus on fairness and biases create structures that protect power.

Principles of Data Feminism 
According to D'Ignazio's and Klein's book Data Feminism, data feminism consists of seven principles: 

 Principle #1 of Data Feminism is to Examine Power. 
 Data feminism begins by analyzing how power and privilege operate in the world. It examines systems of power and how it intersects with other issues, including racism and sexism.  Examining power means naming and explaining the forces of oppression that are part of our daily lives, and into the datasets, databases, and algorithms they use. These are so much a part of our lives that we often don’t even see them as such.
 Principle #2 of Data Feminism is to Challenge Power. 
 Data feminism commits to challenging unequal power structures and working toward justice. Taking action against unequal power takes many forms, but D'Ignazio and Klein offer four starting points: (1) Collect: Compiling counterdata—in the face of missing data or institutional neglect;  (2) Analyze: Challenging power often requires demonstrating inequitable outcomes across groups, and new computational methods are being developed to audit opaque algorithms and hold institutions accountable; (3) Imagine: We cannot only focus on inequitable outcomes, because then we will never get to the root cause of injustice. In order to truly dismantle power, we have to imagine our end point not as “fairness,” but as co-liberation; (4) Teach: The identities of data scientists matter, so how might we engage and empower newcomers to the field in order to shift the demographics and cultivate the next generation of data feminists?
 Principle #3 of Data Feminism is to Elevate Emotion and Embodiment. 
 Data feminism teaches us to value multiple forms of knowledge, including the knowledge that comes from people as living, feeling bodies in the world. This means being aware of setting up false dichotomies, such as valuing subjectivity over or seemingly objective data and visualisations over that which is upfront about activating emotion—leveraging, rather than resisting, emotion. Might more consciously visual paradigms help in learning, remembering and communicating data. Exploring these questions helps to get closer to the third principle of data feminism: embrace emotion and embodiment.
 Principle #4 of Data Feminism is to Rethink Binaries and Hierarchies. 
 Data feminism requires us to challenge the gender binary, along with other systems of counting and classification that perpetuate oppression. This principle argues not for doing away with classification systems, but to rethink the categories: are they adequate? What was their motive in creating them? What happens to those who do not fit into the established systems? Data Feminism asks if the categories, or even the system of classification itself is inadequate. Lurking under the surface of so many classification systems are false binaries and implied hierarchies, such as the artificial distinctions between men and women, reason and emotion, nature and culture, and body and world. Data Feminism argues for our questioning the distinctions, why they have come about and what values they reflect.
 Principle #5 of Data Feminism is to Embrace Pluralism. 
 "Data feminism insists that the most complete knowledge comes from synthesizing multiple perspectives, with priority given to local, Indigenous, and experiential ways of knowing." This means that data feminism challenges traditional monopolies of knowledge production, e.g. in male-led Western science, and encourages researchers to look into more marginalised sources, including those available only through oral interviewing. Special attention also needs to be paid to voices that are overheard in an algorithm-driven digital sphere. Quoting Ali Alkhatib (2020), D'Ignazio and Klein state that “digital contact tracing will exclude the poor, children, and myriad other uncounted groups”.
 Principle #6 of Data Feminism is to Consider Context.
 "Data feminism asserts that data are not neutral or objective. They are the products of unequal social relations, and this context is essential for conducting accurate, ethical analysis." Stressing that data are never neutral but collected in certain socio-cultural contexts and analysed through potentially biased lenses, D'Ignazio and Klein point out that we must not take statistics for granted but always need to look at the stories behind them. This includes, for instance, a critical assessment of COVID-19 data that seem to confirm stereotypes against uneducated, politically immature immigrant communities or people of colour. Instead of using data to re-inforce biases, data feminism challenges the more deeply-rooted discriminations that lead to isolation, a lack of healthcare access, or a lack of trust in government policy in the first place. Joia Crear-Perry (2018), one of the authors quoted by D'Ignazio and Klein, has emphasised: “Race Isn’t a Risk Factor … Racism Is".
Principle #7 of Data Feminism is to Make Labor Visible.
 The work of data science, like all work in the world, is the work of many hands. Data feminism makes this labor visible so that it can be recognized and valued.“ This principle draws attention to the fact that, until only recently, academic work was almost exclusively credited to higher-ranking researchers such as professors and research group leaders while many contributions made by those on temporary contracts, PhD candidates, students or non-academic staff went unnoticed. Data feminism therefore incites us to uncover hidden work that goes into science output and re-evaluate the labor of those who gather data, clean data, or model data behind the scenes. Going further back in history, this can also include the contributions of scientists‘ wives and other female family member who could not legally participate in research projects.

Reception 
After the publication of Data Feminism in 2020 D'Ignazio's and Klein's approach received critical acclaim in academic reviews for their thoughtful and thorough scholarship. The authors have also received praise for embodying their intersectional feminism (particularly the book’s seventh principle, ‘Make Labor Visible’) in the pages of their bibliography by providing a problem-led breakdown of their sources, as well for their open community review process. An example of how data feminism is used is the Urban Belonging project initiated in 2021 by a collective of planners and scholars in Europe with the ambition of mapping lived experiences of underrepresented communities in the city. Folding into data feminism, this research experiments, among other things, with making maps and visualisations that break hierarchies, challenge binaries and exposes power dynamics.

References 

Feminist movements and ideologies
Feminist theory
Feminist books